Before World War I, the Reformed Christian Church in Serbia (Szerbiai Református Keresztén Egyház in Hungarian) was part of the Reformed Church in Hungary. In the period of the Reformation, Rev Sztáray planted 120 Calvinist congregations in the region. In the period of the Ottoman Empire, regions of Hungary were part of the empire and some villages were destroyed. After the Turks were defeated, Hungarian Calvinists emerged from Debrecen and Szentes. In 1898, a whole Catholic village converted to the Calvinist faith because the Catholic church refused to celebrate the mass in the Hungarian language. After World War I, this part of Hungary was connected to Serbia. In 1933, the Reformed Church in Yugoslavia was founded. At that time, among Hungarians, there were German Calvinist congregations; the Germans arrived in this region in the 18th century. After World War II, the Germans were forced to leave the country. There are Czech-speaking and a remnant of German speaking congregations, which had suffered during the Communist regime. A number of congregations separated when Croatia become independent to form the Reformed Christian Church in Croatia.

The church affirms the Apostles Creed, Athanasian Creed, Nicene Creed, Heidelberg Catechism, Second Helvetic Confession, just like the official confessions of the Hungarian Reformed Church. The Reformed Hungarian speaking minority lives in predominantly in the northern part, especially in Vojvodina.

The Reformed Christian Church in Serbia had 17,000 members in almost 50 congregations composed in two presbyteries, served by 19 pastors in 2006. The headquarters of the church is Feketić (Bácsfeketehegy in Hungarian). The bishop is István Csete szemesi.

Member of the World Communion of Reformed Churches.

References

External links 
Church website

Reformed denominations in Europe
Protestantism in Serbia
Members of the World Communion of Reformed Churches